Macrochilo santerivalis, known generally as the floating water plantain moth or macrochilo moth, is a species of litter moth in the family Erebidae. It is found in North America.

The MONA or Hodges number for Macrochilo santerivalis is 8359.1.

References

Further reading

 
 
 

Herminiinae
Articles created by Qbugbot
Moths described in 1982